Krishnam Vande Jagadgurum is a 2012 Indian Telugu-language action drama film directed by Krish and jointly produced by Saibabu Jagarlamudi and Rajeev Reddy on First Frame Entertainment. It has received universal acclaim for combining the art form of Surabhi and an action flick based on illegal mining in Bellary. It stars Rana Daggubati and Nayanthara, while Kota Srinivasa Rao, Milind Gunaji, Murali Sharma, Brahmanandam, Posani Krishna Murali, and L. B. Sriram appear in supporting roles. Mani Sharma composed the music for the film.

It was released on 30 November 2012 to high critical acclaim and was declared a hit at the box office.

Plot
The film starts with Devika (Nayanthara) documenting illegal mining in Bellary by Reddappa (Milind Gunaji), a ruthless business tycoon. Reddappa burns down a village so that the people leave, because under it is a large iron ore deposit, which he wants to mine. The villagers, especially Matti Raju (L. B. Sriram), want to kill Reddappa to take revenge. It is later revealed that Devika is not a journalist but an informer of the CBI.

In Hyderabad, Babu (Rana Daggubati) performs in stage plays under the tutelage of his grandfather "Surabhi" Subrahmanyam (Kota Srinivasa Rao). However, Babu is not interested in acting and decides to leave for the US for a better life. Heartbroken upon learning of his grandson's intentions, Subrahmanyam dies the same night. Babu realizes his mistake and decides to fulfill his grandfather's last wish of performing in the play Krishnam Vande Jagadgurum, which was written by Subrahmanyam. Babu goes to Bellary with his troupe to stage the play. The troupe lives with Rampam (Brahmanandam), who is originally known as Rangasthala Pandit (Telugu) / Sanathanam (Tamil).

There, one of Babu's troupe members has an altercation with Reddappa's right-hand man, Saida, who cuts his tongue and urinates on Subrahmanyam's ashes. Babu sets out to find Saida and take revenge. In the process, Babu meets Devika, and they both set out to Reddappa's mines in Tippu Sultan's (Posani Krishna Murali) taxi. After beating Reddappa's men, Babu runs into his maid, who reveals his past to him. Babu's mother's brother, Chakravarthy (Murali Sharma), had killed his parents when Babu was a toddler. To save Babu, his maid took him away and handed him over to Subrahmanyam, who adopted him. After learning about his past, Babu pursues Chakravarthy to kill him.

Chakravarthy's men attack Reddappa to kill him but fail. It is revealed that Reddappa and Chakravarthy were friends in the past who are foes now. Babu reunites with his troupe, who have been searching for him, and starts to prepare for the Krishnam Vande Jagadgurum play. Devika finds Chakravarthy and tells him that Babu is coming to kill him. Chakravarthy tells her that he is actually Reddappa, and Reddappa is the real Chakravarthy and tells her about his past. Chakravarthy, who killed his sister and her husband, ran to Redappa. Soon after, he stole Redappa's identity and had police arrest Redappa, informing them that he is Chakravarthy.

Chakravarthy is captured by Reddappa's men, who make Chakravarthy mute by damaging his vocal cords with boiling water. Back in Bellary, Babu finally arranges the Krishnam Vande Jagadgurum play on the eve of Durgashtami and invites Redappa to watch the drama. Babu reveals to him that he wants to kill his maternal uncle Chakravarthy to avenge his parents' death. Reddappa promises to hand over Chakravarthy as a gift of Durgashtami. Reddappa brings Chakravarthy to the play and notifies Babu of it. However, Babu comes off the stage to attack Chakravarthy (because Babu thinks he is Chakravarthy) and Reddappa (because he destroyed the village). Babu's maid comes just in time and reveals who the real Chakravarthy is. Babu finds out that Chakravarthy changed his name to Redappa and attacks him. Babu is injured but manages to fight Chakravarthy, while the  Reddappa kills all of Chakravarthy's men as revenge. Babu takes revenge on Chakravarthy by handing him over to villagers, where Matti Raju burns him alive. Babu sets afloat Subrahmanyam's ashes into the Thungabhadra river.

Cast

 Rana Daggubati as Babu
 Nayanthara as Devika
 Kota Srinivasa Rao as Subrahmanyam
 Milind Gunaji as Redappa (Fake)/Chakravarthy 
 Murali Sharma as Chakravarthy (Fake) / Reddappa
 Brahmanandam as Rampam (Rangasthala Pandit)
 Posani Krishna Murali as Tippu Sultan
 L.B. Sriram as Matti Raju
 Adithya as Ramamurthy Naidu, Babu's father
 Lakshmi Vasudevan as Babu's mother
 Annapoorna as Jogamma
 Raghu Babu as Veeraraju
 Satyam Rajesh as Swamy
 Hema as Rathna Prabha
 Ravi Prakash as Pattabhi
 Kishore
 Roopa Devi
 Prabhakar
 Hazel Keech as item number Chal Chal Chal"
 Ventakesh Daggubati as Ballari Babu (special appearance) in song "Sye Andre Nanu"
 Sameera Reddy as item number "Sye Andre Nanu"

Production
Rana was cast for the lead role of Babu, a young drama artist. Nayanthara was cast to play the crucial role of a documentary filmmaker. She dubbed for the role herself. Sameera Reddy was hired for an item number with Venkatesh making a cameo appearance in this movie.

Soundtrack

The audio launch of Krishnam Vande Jagadgurum was held on 7 October 2012 in Hyderabad. Rather differently, the film's director Krish and hero Rana Daggubati played the hosts apart from Gayathri Bhargavi. Nayantara, who seldom attends audio events, attended the function. Others who graced the event include Venkatesh, S. S. Rajamouli, Dil Raju, D. Ramanaidu, Sirivennela Sitaramasastri, Mani Sharma, and Kota Srinivasa Rao. Venkatesh gave the first CD to S. S. Rajamouli.

Release
The Central Board of Film Certification rated it U/A with 14 cuts and violence in all fights has been reduced by at least 50%. Krishnam Vande Jagadgurum was expected to open in 1,000 screens worldwide and is likely to outnumber Aamir Khan's Talaash in terms of screens in south India. The film was to be released across an equal number of screens in Andhra Pradesh, Karnataka, Kerala and Tamil Nadu.

The film was simultaneously released as Ongaram in Tamil and as Action Khiladi in Malayalam. It was also dubbed and released in Hindi as Krishna Ka Badla in 2014.

Reception
idlebrain.com jeevi gave a rating of 3/5 stating "Krishnam Vande Jagadgurum is film that mixes the sensibilities of Krish with commercial elements." Riya Chakravarthy of NDTV gave a review stating: "Krishnam Vande Jagadgurum is a mix of a commendable acting and a good script. Like with his previous movies, Krish has once again proved his directorial credentials with this film. Overall, a good watch that will appeal to all types of audience." Rediff gave a review stating "All in all, Krishnam Vande Jagadgurum is a film to be seen for its fine story and well-defined characteristation. It is both thought-provoking and entertaining and the music, camera work, acting and technical elements are all good. Go watch KVJ." Oneindia.in gave a rating 3.5/5 stating "Overall, Krishnam Vande Jagadgurum is both a good entertainer and a thought provoking movie. Rana will definitely rock you. Don't miss it this weekend." Mahesh S Koneru of 123telugu.com gave a review of rating 3.5/5 stating "'Krishnam Vande Jagadgurum' is a riveting entertainer, one of those rare films where entertainment and thought provoking narration exist together. Don't be fooled by the slow start to the film. More importantly, don't miss a chance to catch 'Krishnam Vande Jagadgurum' this weekend." Mirchi9.com gave a review stating "Krishnam Vande Jagadgurum is a thought provoking intense entertainer which carries an inherent message in it. Leaving aside the commercial dynamics of the movie, the movie is a must watch." Tikkview.com gives 3.9/5 for this film saying that it is a mass movie.

Awards

Box office
The film collected around 151 m in 20 days worldwide.

References

External links
 

Indian action drama films
Films about mining
Indian films based on actual events
2012 films
Films directed by Krish
Films scored by Mani Sharma
2010s Telugu-language films
2012 action films